Ilyichyovsky , rural localities in Russia, may refer to:

 Ilyichyovsky, Kursk Oblast, a khutor
 Ilyichyovsky, Samara Oblast, a settlement
 Ilyichyovsky, Tambov Oblast, a settlement
 Ilyichyovsky, Tatarstan, a settlement

See also
 Ilyichyovka